Pascual Pacheco (born 1 October 1962) is an Ecuadorian taekwondo practitioner. He competed in the men's finweight at the 1988 Summer Olympics.

References

External links
 

1962 births
Place of birth unknown
Living people
Ecuadorian taekwondo practitioners
Olympic taekwondo practitioners of Ecuador
Taekwondo practitioners at the 1988 Summer Olympics
Medalists at the 1987 Pan American Games
Taekwondo practitioners at the 1987 Pan American Games
Pan American Games medalists in taekwondo
Pan American Games bronze medalists for Ecuador